The University of Edinburgh Medical School (also known as Edinburgh Medical School) is the medical school of the University of Edinburgh in Scotland and the United Kingdom and part of the College of Medicine and Veterinary Medicine. It was established in 1726, during the Scottish Enlightenment, making it the oldest medical school in the United Kingdom and is one of the oldest medical schools in the English-speaking world.

It is widely regarded as one of the best medical schools in the United Kingdom and the world. The medical school in 2022 was ranked 1st in the UK by the Guardian University Guide, In 2021, it was ranked third in the UK by The Times University Guide, and the Complete University Guide. It also ranked 21st in the world by both the Times Higher Education World University Rankings and the QS World University Rankings in the same year. According to a Healthcare Survey run by Saga in 2006, the medical school's main teaching hospital, the Royal Infirmary of Edinburgh, was considered the best hospital in Scotland.

As one of the preeminent medical schools in medical history, the medical school's early focus on academic understanding puts its graduates amongst the top candidates in postgraduate qualification exams, and renders them very competitive applicants with regard to clinical posts. Alongside the University of Oxford and Cambridge University, Edinburgh is seen as one of the three medical research powers in the United Kingdom.

The medical school is associated with 13 Nobel Prize winners: 7 winners of the Nobel Prize in Physiology or Medicine and 6 winner of the Nobel Prize in Chemistry. Graduates of the medical school have founded medical schools and universities all over the world including 5 out of the 7 Ivy League medical schools (Harvard, Yale, Columbia, Pennsylvania and Dartmouth), Vermont, McGill, Sydney, Montréal, the Royal Postgraduate Medical School (now part of Imperial College London), the Cape Town, Birkbeck, Middlesex Hospital and the London School of Medicine for Women (both now part of UCL).

 the school accepted 184 medical students per year from the United Kingdom, 5 students from the European Union and an additional 14 students from elsewhere. However, since 2020, admission numbers have spiked, with more than 300 students enrolled in the 2022/23 academic year. Admission is extremely competitive, with an acceptance rate of 2.5% in the 2021-2022 admissions year. The yield rate, the percentage of people who are accepted who choose to attend, is 71% for the 2012–13 admissions year. The school requires the 3rd highest entry grades in the UK according to the Guardian University Guide 2014. Moira Whyte has  been head of the school since 2016.

History

Although the University of Edinburgh's Faculty of Medicine was not formally organised until 1726, medicine had been taught at Edinburgh since the beginning of the sixteenth century. Its formation was dependent on the incorporation of the Surgeons and Barber Surgeons, in 1505 and the foundation of the Royal College of Physicians of Edinburgh in 1681.

The University was modelled on the University of Bologna, but medical teaching was based on that of the sixteenth century University of Padua, and later on the University of Leiden (where most of the founding faculty had studied) in an attempt to attract foreign students, and maintain potential Scottish students in Scotland.

Since the Renaissance the primary facet of medical teaching here was anatomy and, therefore, Alexander Monro primus was appointed Professor of Anatomy in 1720. Later his son and grandson (both of the same name) would hold the position, establishing a reign of Professor Alexander Monros lasting 128 years. In subsequent years four further chairs completed the faculty allowing it to grant the qualification of Doctor of Medicine (MD) without the assistance of the Royal College of Physicians.

Success in the teaching of medicine and surgery through the eighteenth century was achieved thanks to the first teaching hospital, town physicians and the town guild of Barber Surgeons (later to become the Royal College of Surgeons of Edinburgh). By 1764 the number of medical students was so great that a new 200-seat Anatomy Theatre was built in the College Garden. Throughout the 18th century until the First World War the Edinburgh Medical School was widely considered the best medical school in the English speaking world. Students were attracted to the Edinburgh Medical School from Ireland, America and the Colonies by a succession of brilliant teachers, such as William Cullen, James Gregory and Joseph Black, the opportunities afforded by the Royal Medical Society and a flourishing Extra-Mural School.

Royal Infirmary of Edinburgh

The first voluntary hospital to be established in Scotland was the Edinburgh Infirmary for the Sick Poor, which was established both for charitable and teaching purposes. The project was led by Alexander Monro, supported by influential Edinburgh politician George Drummond who was keen to establish Edinburgh as a centre for medical excellence. The Royal College of Physicians conducted a fundraising appeal, attracting £2000 for the hospital by 1728.

The Edinburgh Royal Infirmary began operating from a small house—leased from the University of Edinburgh—which was located opposite the head of Robertson's Close, in today's Infirmary Street. Resident staff included a matron, one domestic servant, and volunteer physicians and surgeons who attended in fortnightly rotations. Only four beds were available from 6 August 1729 and medical students' visits were limited to two tickets only per student (to prevent crowding).

Work began in 1738 with William Adam as architect and in 1741, shortly after the foundation of the college, a 228-bed purpose-built hospital opened on land in what would become Infirmary Street, near Surgeons' Hall in Edinburgh. In addition to medical and surgical wards this new hospital included cells for lunatic patients and surgical operation theatre seats for 200 students.

Due to overcrowding throughout this High School Yards site, David Bryce was commissioned to design a new hospital – the Royal Infirmary of Edinburgh on Lauriston Place close to the university and next door to where the medical school buildings would be built in 1880.

In 2003 a new 900-bed Royal Infirmary opened at Little France, in the south-east of the city, replacing the facility on Lauriston Place.

Royal Botanic Garden

The Edinburgh Botanic Garden was created in 1670 for study of medicinal plants by Dr Robert Sibbald (later first Professor of Medicine at Edinburgh University) and Dr Andrew Balfour. It gave a base for the development of study of Pharmacology (Materia Medica) and Chemistry. Originally at St Anne's Yards adjacent to Holyrood Palace, the garden measured a meagre . It moved subsequently to the ground now occupied by Waverley station and in the 1760s was again relocated to Shrubhill between Edinburgh and Leith. It was not until after 1820 that the garden and its contents began the move to its present-day location in Inverleith ('The Inverleith Garden') by Robert Graham (appointed Regius Keeper, 1820–45). It is currently recognised as the second oldest botanic garden in Britain after Oxford (OBG founded in 1620).

The nineteenth century saw a growth of new sciences at Edinburgh, notably of Physiology and Pathology, and the development of Public Health and Psychiatry. Midwifery was finally admitted as an essential part of the compulsory medical curriculum.

Admission of women

In 1869 Sophia Jex-Blake was reluctantly accepted to attend a limited number of classes in the School of Medicine, enrolling Edinburgh in the heated international battle for women to enter medicine. Full equality between the sexes was not achieved at Edinburgh Medical School until 20 years later. British medical schools openly refused to accept women students at this time. Jex-Blake persuaded Edinburgh University to allow not only herself, but also her friend, Edith Pechy, to attend medical lectures.

Teviot Place

In the 1860s the medical school was constrained within the Old College and by 1880 the new Royal Infirmary had been built on Lauriston Place. The construction of new medical buildings began and they were completed by 1888, in Teviot Place, adjacent to the Royal Infirmary. Together they housed the Medical Faculty with proper facilities for teaching, scientific research and practical laboratories. This complex came to be known as the "New Quad," in contrast to the Old College (sometimes known as the "Old Quad") and New College, which was not originally part of the university.

The competition to design the University's new buildings was won by the architect Sir Robert Rowand Anderson in 1877 (who later designed the dome of the Robert Adam/William Henry Playfair Old College building). After extensive European travel, he decided upon a 'Cinquecento' Italian Renaissance style which he judged "more suitable than Greek or Palladian, where the interior would have been constrained by the formal exterior, or mediaeval, which would have been out of keeping with the spirit of scientific medical enquiry". Initially the design incorporated a new University Graduation Hall, but as this was seen as too ambitious. A separate building was constructed for the purpose, the McEwan Hall, also designed by Anderson, after funds were made available by the brewer Sir William McEwan in 1894. The final grand structure took three years to decorate including elaborate ceiling murals and organ.

The Medical School was designed around two courts, with a grand public quadrangle at the front and, for discreet delivery of cadavers to the dissection rooms, a second private yard entered from the lane behind. The Professor of Anatomy, Sir William Turner (Professor 1867 to 1903, Principal 1903 to 1917) was placed in charge of the project leading to the construction of a three-storey galleried Anatomy Museum with displays of everything from whales to apes as well as human anatomy, an associated library and a whole series of dissecting rooms, laboratories, and a grand anatomy lecture theatre (based on that at Padua) with steeply raked benches rising above the central dissecting table. The Anatomy Museum has since been plastered and its remnants are now a student study space, off-limits to the general public, although the grand elephant skeletons that were once the hallmark of the museums entrance still remain in the east wing.

Today the medical buildings at Teviot Place focus on the teaching of pre-clinical subjects such as biochemistry and anatomy. The building still holds the anatomy teaching laboratory (although prosection has replaced dissection) and anatomy resource centre (a scaled down version of the anatomy museum) and the original lecture theatre. The building also hosts the Biomedical Teaching Organisation, where subjects allied to medicine (such as physiology and forensic science) are taught to senior biology students and to medical students taking intercalated degrees.

There are also currently plans to hand the West Wing of the medical school to the History Department of Edinburgh University, as the previous occupants (the Department of Medical Microbiology) have moved to the new campus at Little France.

Department of General Practice
In the 1950s the University's general practice teaching unit was developed. It became the world's first independent department of General Practice.

Little France

The Chancellor's Building was opened on 12 August 2002 by The Duke of Edinburgh and houses the new £40 million Medical School at the New Royal Infirmary in Little France. It was a joint project between private finance, the local authorities and the University to create a large modern hospital, veterinary clinic and research institute and thus the University is currently (2003) in the process of moving its Veterinary and Medical Faculties there (and quite possibly also the School of Nursing). It has two large lecture theatres and a medical library. It is connected to the new Edinburgh Royal Infirmary by a series of corridors.

Polish School of Medicine

The Polish School of Medicine was established in 1941 as "a wartime testament to this spirit of enlightenment".  Students were to be those drawn from the Polish army to Britain and were taught in Polish. Classes in pre-clinical subjects were held at the Medical School. Clinical teaching was carried out mainly at the Royal Infirmary of Edinburgh in Lauriston Place. Former nurses' quarters in the grounds of the Western General were designated The Paderewski Hospital and used to provide care for members of the Polish armed forces and Polish civilians.

The project was initiated by Lt. Col. Professor Francis Crew, then commanding officer at the Military Hospital in Edinburgh Castle, and Lt. Col. Dr Antoni Jurasz, the school's organiser and first dean.

The school was closed in September 1950. 336 students matriculated, of which 227 students graduated with the equivalent of an MBChB. A total of 19 doctors obtained a doctorate or MD. A bronze plaque commemorating the existence of the Polish School of Medicine is located in the Quadrangle of the Medical School in Teviot Place.

Edinburgh Model
The Edinburgh Model was a model of medical teaching developed by the University of Edinburgh in the 18th century and widely emulated around the world including at the University of Pennsylvania Perelman School of Medicine and the McGill University Faculty of Medicine. It was a two-tiered education model, revolutionary and well suited to the medical system of the UK at the time. First, the model offered its students studies in all branches of science, not just medicine. According to Mary Hewson, "every branch of science was regularly taught, and drawn together so compactly from one to the other." Edinburgh offered the most extensive selection of courses in any university in Britain.

Furthermore, it had a two-tiered education model which allowed a great number of students to matriculate, but allowed few to graduate. The requirements for an MD were very stringent. Students had to attend all lectures with the exception of midwifery (although it was strongly encouraged nonetheless), they had to study for at minimum 3 years, had to write a series of oral and written examinations in Latin and had to compose a Latin thesis and defend it before the whole faculty. Consequently, the majority of students attended Edinburgh with the intention of learning medicine for 1 year before leaving due to the costs of a degree and the fact that an MD degree was not required to practice medicine. Between 1765 and 1825, only 20% of Edinburgh students graduated with an MD.

Later on this Edinburgh Model developed into a more formal university medical education curriculum, which was spread around the world by its graduates. In 1825, the years of medical education increased from three to four years and in 1833, English replaced Latin as the language of examination.

Admission
Gaining admission to study medicine at the University of Edinburgh is highly competitive. In 2013, there were 2150 Home/EU applications for 190 Home/EU positions leading to an applicant to place ratio of 11 to 1. In addition, there were 715 overseas applications for 17 international spots, an applicant to place ratio of 42 to 1.

The minimum entry qualifications include:

SQA Highers: AAAAB. AAAAB at one sitting to include Chemistry and two of Biology, Maths or Physics. Students unable to take two of Biology, Maths, Physics in S5 may take the missing subject(s) in S6. Human Biology may replace Biology. Standard Grade Credit (or Intermediate 2) in Biology, Chemistry, English, Maths.

GCE A Levels: AAA. (A previous requirement for an additional AS-level was dropped for 2018 entry following the reform of the English A level specifications). A levels must include Chemistry and one of Biology, Maths or Physics. Only one of Maths or Further Maths will be considered. Human Biology may replace Biology. GCSE grade B in Biology, Chemistry, English, Maths. Double Award Combined Sciences at grade BB may replace GCSE grades in sciences.

International Baccalaureate: 37 points. Including 667 at Higher Level with Chemistry and at least one other science subject (Biology preferred). For the 2012 admissions year, no offer was given to a student who achieved below 41 IB points with 776 at Higher Level.

Additional requirements include the UK Clinical Aptitude Test (UKCAT) is a mandatory requirement for all students applying to study Medicine at Edinburgh and applicants are required to sit the test during the summer prior to application.

The 6 year MBChB course can extend a pre-entry year for applicants without adequate subject choice but with the right qualifications who otherwise would be admitted on to the 6-year programme. An 'intercalated year' between years 2 and 3 to gain a BSc or BMedSci in a separate scientific discipline is mandatory.

Current course
Degrees available for study: Medical Sciences (BSc), Medicine (6-year course) (MBChB) including an intercalated Medical Sciences degree (BMedSci).
A new medical degree for healthcare professionals already working in Scotland will start in September 2020. The HCP-Med programme runs for 5 years, with the first 3 years part-time and online, while students continue part-time in their current employment. During this time they also have an attachment to a local GP and three full-time weeks in Edinburgh each year. For years 4 and 5, they join the main undergraduate MBChB programme full-time and be based in Edinburgh.

The following course outline relates to the Medicine (MbChB) course.
The course adopts a number of programme themes throughout the delivery of all six years and which influence the way in which modules are taught and assessed. These are biomedical science, psychological aspects of medicine, social sciences and public health, evidence based medicine and research, the consultation, presentation, diagnosis and management, clinical communication, emergency care, clinical pharmacology, medical informatics, medical ethics and last but not least, professional development.

Years 1 and 2
First-year students undertake the study of Biomedical Science and Health, Ethics and Society, which provide an introduction to the scientific, sociological and behavioural principles for the practice of medicine. Clinical communication and resuscitation skills are also taught. Students get early patient communication exposure through placements at GP practices, and have the opportunity to investigate a chosen healthcare issue in a clinical setting during Student Selected Component 1. During the first semester, to December, students are taught the 'fundamentals of medicine' which consists of all the basics including genetics, embryology, anatomy, cytology, neuroscience, neoplasia, infection and immunity and pharmacology. In the second semester, the course moves into systems-oriented modules of respiratory, cardiology and locomotor systems, aided by problem-based learning exercises. Alongside the fundamentals course, the health, ethics and society modules introduce students to topics such as lay perspectives of health, the experience of illness, doctor patient relationships and medical ethics.

In Year 2, students continue study of the body systems in Biomedical Science and pick further Student Selected Components. Systems and problem-based learning continues with neurology, GI and liver, endocrine and digestion and finally renal and urology. In Epidemiology and Statistics, critical appraisal of medical papers is applied to refine knowledge. In Introduction to Clinical Practice, students undertake basic history-taking and examination in weekly general practice placements.

Year 3
For many years, students were able to undertake an intercalated degree in a scientific discipline of choice. From 2016 entry, this additional year has been made a standard part of the course. Over 20 fields of scientific study are available with students typically joining the School of Biological Sciences or Biomedical Sciences. At the end of this year, students graduate with a Bachelor of Medical Sciences (BMedSci) degree with honours in their chosen field of study.

Years 4 and 5
Years 4 and 5 consist of systems-based clinical teaching aiming to cover the major medical and surgical specialties. Clinical attachments are undertaken, with a strong emphasis on patient-based learning through bedside teaching, attending clinics and ward rounds. Learning is enhanced with lectures, tutorials and research in Student Selected Components.

Year 6
The final year completes the clinical years by covering General Medicine, General Practice, General Surgery, Critical Care, Anaesthesia, Emergency Medicine, Medicine for the Elderly. A 6-week elective attachment, where students often experience medicine abroad, and a 6-week FY1 assistantship are undertaken towards the end of the year following the final examinations.

Facilities
Undergraduate teaching through Year 1 and 2 centres mainly in the Old Medical School buildings on Teviot Row, in the university quarter of Edinburgh city centre. Clinical years (4, 5 and 6) are spent spread across the three main teaching hospitals in Edinburgh: the Royal Infirmary of Edinburgh in the city's southern Green Belt; the Western General Hospital just west of the city centre, and the Royal Hospital for Sick Children in the centre of the city.

The Royal Infirmary of Edinburgh is the main clinical teaching environment of the Medical School. The Chancellor's Building at Little France, next to the new Royal Infirmary, was opened on 12 August 2002 by Prince Philip, Duke of Edinburgh, then Chancellor to the University.
 The Biological Sciences and Hospital-based Clinical Subjects both gained a 5 rating in the 2008 RAE
 The Edinburgh was ranked 1st among all UK medical schools for Hospital-based Clinical subjects in the 2008 RAE

Edinburgh Electronic Medical Curriculum
Edinburgh Electronic Medical Curriculum is an online virtual learning environment (VLE) which allows students securely protected access direct to any of the information on or for the MBChB course. It also encompasses announcements, discussions and the use of the tools embedded in EEMeC to facilitate and manage students' progress through the course including exam results and computer aided learning programmes. Created in 1998 this was one of the first of its kind in the world and has since provided a model for other medical schools to follow. In 2005 The University of Edinburgh was awarded a Queen's Anniversary Prize for EEMeC and The Virtual Hospital Online. In August 2017, EEMeC was retired in favour of LEARN, the University of Edinburgh's VLE.

Research
Edinburgh Medical School was ranked third in the UK in the Research Excellence Framework 2014 for Neuroscience and Biological Sciences and top five for Clinical Medicine.

Edinburgh University is a member of the Russell Group of universities, receiving a quanta of a third of British research funding. In the last UK-wide Research Assessment Exercise, three-quarters of the College's research staff were in academic units rated 5 or 5 star (the maximum possible ratings). This was more noteworthy in view of the large size of the College's research groupings. The College has average research income in excess of £45 million/annum, and the figure has been steadily increasing each year.

Main sources of research funding include UK research councils, UK medical and veterinary medical charities, industry and commerce and European Union bodies.

The University is home to 7 MRC Centres, tied for 2nd in the UK with the University of Oxford and behind the University of Cambridge, a BHF Centre, a Wellcome Trust Centre, a Wellcome Trust Clinical Research Facility, a Cancer Research UK Centre, the Anne Rowling Regenerative Neurology Clinic, the Usher Institute and the Euan MacDonald Centre :
 MRC Centre for Cognitive Ageing and Cognitive Epidemiology
 MRC Centre for Genetics and Molecular Medicine
 MRC Centre for Human Genetics
 MRC Centre for Inflammation Research
 MRC Centre for Public Health Research and Policy
 MRC Centre for Regenerative Medicine
 MRC Centre for Reproductive Health
 Wellcome Trust Centre for Cell Biology
 Wellcome Trust Clinical Research Facility
 BHF Centre for Cardiovascular Science
 Euan MacDonald Centre for Motor Neurone Disease
 Edinburgh Cancer Research Centre
 Anne Rowling Regenerative Neurology Clinic
 Institute of Population Health Sciences and Informatics

Recent research and discoveries:
 2013 – Researchers successfully synthesize human blood using stem cells
 2014 – Researchers led by Dr. Clare Blackburn successfully regenerated a living organ, the thymus, for the first time in mice
 2015 – Researchers developed a UK national prescribing test taken by all graduating UK medical students

Textbooks
Many medical textbooks published around the world have been written by Edinburgh graduates:
 Robert Muir – wrote Muir's Textbook of Pathology now in its 14th edition
 John George Macleod – wrote Macleod's Clinical Examination now in its 12th edition and Macleod's Clinical Diagnosis now in its 13th edition
 John C. Boileau Grant – wrote Grant's Method of Anatomy now in its 11th edition and Grant's Atlas of Anatomy now in its 13th edition
 Stanley Davidson – wrote Davidson's Principles and Practice of Medicine now in its 22nd edition
 Sir Robert Hutchison, 1st Baronet – wrote Hutchison's Clinical Methods now in its 23rd edition
 Daniel John Cunningham – wrote Cunningham's Manual of Practical Anatomy now in its 15th edition and Cunningham's Textbook of Anatomy now in its 12th edition.

Royal Medical Society
The Royal Medical Society, the medical student society at the University of Edinburgh, is the oldest medical society in the UK, founded in 1734. It became known as 'the Royal Medical Society' from 1778 after it was awarded a Royal Charter, and remains the only student society in the UK to hold one. It owns its own premises including a historical library, meeting hall, computer suite, lounge, kitchen and clinical skills resource centre. The Society was vital to the flourishing reputation of the Medical School through a network of distinguished members and teachers, and its atmosphere of open-minded, forward-thinking debate, tradition and social bonds.

To this day, the Society promotes its values of educational advancement through a wide variety of talks, tutorials and a national conference. It also runs a variety of social events including the infamous White Coat Pub Crawl during Freshers' Week, pub quizzes, a Burns Supper and the Presidents' Annual Dinner in the Royal College of Surgeons. Members are entitled to apply for grants to fund their medical electives, managed by the RMS Trust, which is a registered charitable body. The Society is run by a Council of student members and two permanent secretaries.

Overseas ties
The Edinburgh Medical School has very strong ties to the United States and Canada. Graduates of the medical school went on to found 5 out of the 7 Ivy League medical schools (Pennsylvania, Yale, Columbia, Harvard and Dartmouth). The McGill University Medical School in Montreal and the University of Pennsylvania School of Medicine were modelled after Edinburgh by Edinburgh graduates. Graduates became senators, representatives and participated in the American Revolutionary War. A great number of the early presidential physicians and surgeon generals were trained at Edinburgh. The school runs the Scottish-Canadian Medical Programme jointly with the University of St Andrews School of Medicine and the University of Alberta Faculty of Medicine and Dentistry for Canadian students.

The Edinburgh Medical School has signed a memorandum of understanding with the Christian Medical College, Vellore to establish a Masters of Family Medicine program.

Famous alumni

Faculty
List only includes faculty who were not graduates of the medical school. Faculty that were also graduates of the medical school are listed under alumni.

In popular culture
 In the television show NCIS, the chief medical examiner Dr. Donald "Ducky" Mallard studied medicine at Edinburgh. Ari Haswari, the show's main antagonist for the first two seasons, also studied medicine at Edinburgh.
 In the BBC soap opera Doctors, Dr. Emma Reid studied medicine at Edinburgh.
 In the film The Last King of Scotland, the protagonist Dr. Nicholas Garrigan recently graduated from Edinburgh.
 The character Sherlock Holmes, created by Sir Arthur Conan Doyle, himself a graduate of Edinburgh, was based on Dr. Joseph Bell, a graduate and lecturer at Edinburgh.
 In the BBC television drama Murder Rooms: The Dark Beginnings of Sherlock Holmes, the main protagonists Dr. Joseph Bell and Sir Arthur Conan Doyle are both graduates of Edinburgh.
 In the Australian television drama The Doctor Blake Mysteries, the protagonist Dr. Lucien Blake studied medicine at Edinburgh.

Doctors Pub
Situated directly across the road from the medical school buildings and the old Royal Infirmary, "Doctors" has been the refuge since the 1970s of many Edinburgh Medical School graduates and students.  History drapes the walls in the forms of plaques and photographs.

References

Further reading
 David S Crawford, Canadians who graduated with an MD from the University of Edinburgh 1809 – 1840 and Canadians who graduated in medicine from the University of Edinburgh 1841–1868. http://internatlibs.mcgill.ca/
 Matthew Kaufman, Medical Teaching in Edinburgh during the 18th and 19th Centuries (Edinburgh, the Royal College of Surgeons of Edinburgh, 2003),  
 Tara Womersley, Dorothy H Crawford, Bodysnatchers to Lifesavers: Three Centuries of Medicine in Edinburgh (Luath Press Ltd, Edinburgh, 2010),

External links
 
 
 The Royal College of Surgeons, Edinburgh
 The Royal College of Physicians, Edinburgh
 Royal Medical Society
 Sophia Jex-Blake
 Admission FAQ's

1726 establishments in Scotland
1726 in science
Educational institutions established in 1726
Medical School
Robert Rowand Anderson buildings
Scottish Enlightenment
Edinburgh
Schools of the University of Edinburgh